Share the Fantasy is the third album by godheadSilo, released on January 20, 1998 by Sub Pop.

Track listing

Personnel 

godheadSilo
 Dan Haugh – drums, photography
 Mike Kunka – bass guitar, photography

Technical personnel
 Alex Newport – recording, engineering, mixing
 Eric Stotik – painting

Release history

References

External links 
 

1998 albums
GodheadSilo albums
Sub Pop albums